Villa Nueva is a city in the Guatemala department of Guatemala. The city has a population of 618,397 (2018 census), making it the second largest in Guatemala Department, after Guatemala City. It was founded on 17 April 1763, long before Guatemala declared its independence from the Spanish Empire.
The local economy largely depends on industry, with the municipality having some 100 factories that produce such products as textiles, metallurgical goods, and plastics. The area's agricultural products include rice, dairy, fruits, and vegetables.

Mayor Salvador Gándara, serving from 2000 to 2011, was longlisted for the 2008 World Mayor award; Sites of interest include the Naciones Unidas National Park, . and several malls, like Metrocentro and Santa Clara.

History

Amatitlán Department creation

During governor Mariano Rivera Paz' time in office, a decree was issued on 6 November 1839 declaring Amatitlán and independent district, which also included Palín and Villa Nueva. The decree says: 
 "The city of Amatitlán, San Cristóbal Palín, Villa Nueva, San Miguel and Santa Inés Petapa and all the annexed locations to these settlements will form an independent district for its political government and will be under the charge of a Lieutenant Corregidor, who will act according to the applicable law starting on 2 October of this year and will earn a thousand pesos a year". 
 "In the same district there will be a local court to impart justice".

The district changed its name to Amatitlán Department according to the executive order of 8 May 1866 of field Marshall Vicente Cerna y Cerna government.

Amatitlán Department dissolution and creation of the Villa Nueva municipality

Amatitlán Department was abolished by decree 2081 of 29 April 1935 of president general Jorge Ubico regime. This decree literally reads:

"Considering that it is convenient for the country's best interest that the Amatitlán Department be dissolved.
Decrees:

 Amatitlán Departament is abolished
 Municipalities of Amatitlán, Villa Nueva, San Miguel Petapa and Villa Canales are incorporated into Guatemala Department and those of Palín and San Vicente Pacaya to the Escuintla Department.
 The executive branch will issue the proper instructions to comply with this decree, which will be in effect on 1 July of this year".

Climate

Villa Nueva has a tropical savanna climate (Köppen: Aw).

See also
 
 
List of places in Guatemala
Guatemala Department
Guatemala City

Notes and references

References

Bibliography

 

Amatitlán Department
Municipalities of the Guatemala Department